The Time of Our Lives is an Australian television drama series which premiered on ABC TV on 10 June 2013, at 8.30pm. It is a JAHM Pictures production in association with ABC TV and Film Victoria. The producer Amanda Higgs (co-creator of The Secret Life of Us) and principal writer Judi McCrossin (The Secret Life of Us, Tangle, The Surgeon, Beaconsfield) were also co-creators.

The show follows the lives of the Tivolli clan, an Australian extended family in inner-city Melbourne. Aged in their thirties and forties, the characters are occupied with career advancement, home ownership, child-rearing and the vagaries of relationships.

Aired in a time-slot that meant it competed with other Australian drama shows on commercial free-to-air channels, the series debuted with a "respectable" audience size. The show was renewed for a second season on 18 October 2013. The second season premiered on 26 June 2014. On 5 September 2014, it was announced that the ABC had cancelled The Time of Our Lives.

Cast and characters

Main cast
 Claudia Karvan as Caroline Tivolli
 Justine Clarke as Bernadette Flynn
 Michelle Vergara Moore as Chai Li Tivolli
 Shane Jacobson as Luce Tivolli
 Stephen Curry as Herb
 William McInnes as Matt Tivolli

With
 Tony Barry as Ray Tivolli
 Sue Jones as Rosa Tivolli
 Anita Hegh as Maryanne
 Elise MacDougall as Georgina 'Georgie' Tivolli
 Tully McGahey as Tully Tivolli
 Frances McGahey as Frances Tivolli
 Thomas Fisher as Carmody Tivolli

Supporting cast

 Pia Miranda as Kristin Glaros (Seasons 1–2)
 Catherine McClements as Diana Southey (Season 2)
 Jessica McNamee as Lisa Montago (Season 2)
 Luke McGregor as Luke (Seasons 1–2)
 Dave Lawson as Julian (Season 2)
 Mike McLeish as Mickey Mac (Seasons 1–2)
 Dion Williams as Lachie (Seasons 1–2)
 Calen Mackenzie as Jesse Reid (Seasons 1–2)
 Cheree Cassidy as Alice McQueen (Seasons 1–2)
 Tina Bursill as Lenore (Seasons 1–2)
 Michael Dorman as Joel (Season 1)
 Kate Jenkinson as Eloise (Season 1)
 Damian Walshe-Howling as Ewan (Season 1)
 Mick Molloy as Garrick Graham (Season 1)
 Georgina Naidu as Marla (Season 1)

Episodes

Awards and nominations

References

External links

 Anderson, Doug Time of Our Lives, the Years That Made Us – TV review at Australia Cultureblog, the Guardian, 24 June 2013
 Official ABC website

Australian Broadcasting Corporation original programming
2013 Australian television series debuts
English-language television shows
Television shows set in Melbourne